Whitby School is an independent, co-educational private school in Greenwich, Connecticut, that was founded in 1958 and is accredited by the American Montessori Society (through Grade 2, non-traditional age groupings), the International Baccalaureate Organization and the Connecticut Association of Independent Schools. The Head of School is Dr. John "Jack" Creeden, who joined Whitby in July 2019.

History
The school was founded by Nancy McCormick Rambusch, who founded the American Montessori Society (AMS) in 1960. The founding of Whitby School is credited with initiating a Montessori revival.

The school was named after Whitby Abbey in Yorkshire, England, where a traditional story tells of an abbess who recognized the musical talents of a stable boy and brought him into their educational program.

In 1960, the school moved from rented rooms at Sacred Heart School to its own campus. The school, through the AMS, became the first certified Montessori teacher training program in the United States. Rambusch and the AMS promoted a modified Montessori approach that would facilitate transition of the young students to traditional American schools which led to a split from the Association Montessori Internationale (AMI).

In 1962, Whitby's first two graduates entered high school. The first graduates then entered college in 1965.

In 1975, a toddler class, "Stepping Stones", was created to serve children between two and three years of age. By 1982, Stepping Stones was accepting children at eighteen months of age.

In 1994, the Junior High Division was reconfigured into the present Middle School.

In 2010, Whitby adopted the International Baccalaureate's Primary Years Programme and Middle Years Programme, thus becoming the only school in the United States to be triple-accredited at the time.

In Fall of 2016, Whitby School was approved to acquire an additional five acres of land. This added acreage expanded the school's campus to a total of 30.3 acres, allowing for an additional 16,000 square feet of building space, providing the school with flexibility for further development.

In July 2019, Whitby Board of Trustee named Dr. Jack Creeden as the new Interim Head of School. In January 2020, Dr. Creeden agreed to extend the length of his contract and was named Head of School.

Facilities 

Whitby School stands on 30 acres of land and its buildings have evolved over the years. In 2013, the school built a four-classroom addition, which provided two classrooms for third and fourth grade, as well as a state-of-the-art design room and science room. This was followed by the construction of a new 11,860 square foot Athletics Center that took place between March 2015 and May 2016 and doubled the size of its predecessor.

In 2016, the school added a Makerspace to its library, expanding on the philosophy that the library is a hub for all shared resources and not just books. The Makerspace includes a variety of tools and supplies for students to create items for class or independently. The school worked with Brooklyn's Situ Studio on the project.

Whitby was certified in May 2019 as "School Yard Habitat" that allows for curriculum enhancements and exploration outside the classroom. The habitat is also open to the public.

Student life 

Whitby School is divided into three levels, which makes up the N-8 educational curriculum: Children's House (18 months-Kindergarten), Lower School (Grades 1–4), and Middle School (Grades 5–8). The school has a capacity for 450 students. Whitby currently enrolls 300 students and employs 87 full-time faculty.

Children's House 

Whitby's Children's House is divided into Stepping Stones and Primary levels, which are divided into multiage classrooms. Here, the curriculum is based on a Montessori method for teaching. Three teachers are assigned to each classroom, allowing for individualized attention. The multiage nature of the classroom promotes students to learn from their peers, and for older students to build confidence and leadership skills.

Lower School 

Lower School is the second level at Whitby School and encompasses Grades 1–4. While Grades 1 and 2 remain in a multiage setting, Grades 3 and 4 are divided into separate classrooms. Through Whitby's International Baccalaureate curriculum, the school emphasizes conceptual based transdisciplinary learning. Teachers work to create learning experiences that require using skills from multiple school topics. The end of Lower School is marked by Grade 4 Exhibition. For this assignment, students must pick a topic of their choice to research, consult experts and present to faculty, staff, parents, and fellow students.

Middle school 

Spanning Grades 5–8, the Middle School is the third and final school level at Whitby. Fifth grade also marks the beginning of the IB Middle Years Programme, which continues the emphasis of making real world connections with in-class subject matter. At Whitby, this is also the start of subject specific classes. There is also the opportunity for interdisciplinary units in the Upper School, or when the learning from two different classes supports a single idea or subject. At the end of Middle School, students participate in 8th Grade Project, a student-led project designed to extend their knowledge and develop their skills.

Community service 

A community-centered mindset is instilled at Whitby at an early age. Beginning with Primary, students are introduced to the school's Buddy Program. Here, fifth grade students are paired with their younger counterparts as they first get to know each other and then work on community service projects. As the students enter 6th grade, they start performing community service at outside organizations.

Community service for Whitby students culminates with the 7th and 8th grade service trip to a Spanish-speaking country. Using the Spanish skills they have learned throughout the school's continuum, the students work with local partner organizations in the country they are visiting. In 2017–2019, the students worked with the Mariposa Foundation in the Dominican Republic.

Cocurricular program 

Whitby has an expansive program of classes that extend the academic day. They range from sports to enrichment programs. Students are given the opportunity to choose what cocurricular activity they'd like to participate in, such as chess, music instruction, Chinese, and Mathcounts.

Sports 

Whitby is a member of the Middle School Fairchester Association and competes with local schools over three seasons. The school offers soccer and cross country during the fall, basketball in the winter, and baseball, softball, tennis and cross country in the spring.

Visual and performing arts 

The school also offers a robust Performing Arts program for Middle School students, which leads to at least one production a year. While theater students rehearse for the production, a second group of students work in another cocurricular class called Art Installation, to design and create the production's set.

Secondary school placement 

At the beginning of seventh grade, students begin meeting with Whitby's dedicated secondary school placement team to find best fit secondary schools. Schools Whitby students have gone on to include Choate Rosemary Hall, Phillips Andover, and Phillips Exeter.

References

External links 
 

Buildings and structures in Greenwich, Connecticut
Private elementary schools in Connecticut
Private middle schools in Connecticut
Schools in Fairfield County, Connecticut
1958 establishments in Connecticut